William Laird Whitby (30 January 1838 – 12 October 1922) was a notable New Zealand master mariner and ship owner. He was born in Helhoughton, Norfolk, England in 1838. He unsuccessfully contested the Lyttelton mayoralty at the April 1903 election.

References

1838 births
1922 deaths
English emigrants to New Zealand
New Zealand sailors